Kenzhegali Abenovich Sagadiyev 'Кенжеғали Әбенұлы Сағадиев' (18 February 1938 – 25 July 2020) was a Kazakhstani politician. From 2004 to 2012, Sagadiyev served as a member of the National Assembly of Kazakhstan. He was a member of Nur Otan.

Sagadiyev died on 25 July 2020, from COVID-19 in Nur-Sultan, aged 82.

References

1938 births
2020 deaths
Deaths from the COVID-19 pandemic in Kazakhstan
Nur Otan politicians
Members of the Mazhilis